The Welle Hess Covered Bridge No. S1, also known as the Laubach Covered Bridge, was a historic wooden covered bridge located at Sugarloaf Township in Columbia County, Pennsylvania. It crossed Fishing Creek and was one of 28 historic covered bridges in Columbia and Montour Counties.

It was listed on the National Register of Historic Places (NRHP) in 1979, but collapsed on July 19, 1981. The salvaged wreckage of the bridge was purchased by Ed Campbell, who built a small scale "replica" of the bridge at his restaurant in Orange Township in 1983. The bridge was removed from the NRHP in 1986.

References 

Covered bridges in Columbia County, Pennsylvania
Bridges completed in 1871
Wooden bridges in Pennsylvania
Bridges in Columbia County, Pennsylvania
National Register of Historic Places in Columbia County, Pennsylvania
Covered bridges on the National Register of Historic Places in Pennsylvania
Road bridges on the National Register of Historic Places in Pennsylvania
Burr Truss bridges in the United States
1871 establishments in Pennsylvania
Former National Register of Historic Places in Pennsylvania